Yadavilli may refer to:

 Yadavilli, West Godavari district, a village in West Godavari, Andhra Pradesh, India
 Yadavilli, Kurnool, a village in Kurnool, Andhra Pradesh, India
 Yadavilli (name)